Center of the World may refer to:
 The , the point on the Earth's surface having the greatest cosmological significance
 Center of the World, Ohio, an unincorporated community in Ohio
 Center of the World (album), a 1972 album by free jazz quartet Center of the World
 The Center of the World (novel), a 1988 novel by Andreas Steinhöfel 
 The Center of the World, a 2001 film by Wayne Wang

See also
Navel of the World (disambiguation)
The Middle of the World (disambiguation)
Earth's inner core
Centre of the Earth, a purpose-built environmental education centre in Birmingham, England